Bheri (earlier; Bheri Malika) is an urban municipality located in Jajarkot District of Karnali Province of Nepal.

The municipality is divided into total 13 wards.

The municipality was established on 19 September 2015 merging Khalanga, Punama, Bhur and Jagatipur Village development committee.

No changes were made in this municipality on 10 March 2017, when Government of Nepal restricted old administrative structure and announced 744 local level units as per the new constitution of Nepal 2015.

Demographics
At the time of the 2011 Nepal census, Bheri Municipality had a population of 34,713. 99.9% of these spoke Nepali as their first language.

In terms of ethnicity/caste, 30.4% were Chhetri, 27.8% Kami, 16.9% Thakuri, 13.8% Magar, 3.8% Hill Brahmin, 2.8% Damai/Dholi, 1.6% Sanyasi/Dasnami, 0.7% Newar, 0.5% Badi, 0.4% Gaine, 0.3% Sarki, 0.3% Raji, 0.2% other Terai, 0.2% Chamar/Harijan/Ram, 0.1% Tharu and 0.1% others.

In terms of religion, 99.2% were Hindu and 0.8% Christian.

References

External links
 

Populated places in Jajarkot District
Municipalities in Karnali Province
Nepal municipalities established in 2015